Caulín Bay is a bay located in the northern end of Chiloé Island, Chile. The bay opens to the north to Chacao Channel.

External links

Bays of Chile
Bodies of water of Los Lagos Region